The Fort Garry/Fort Rouge Twins are a Canadian junior ice hockey team currently based in Winnipeg, Manitoba, Canada. Established in 1970 as the Fort Garry/Fort Rouge Blues, the club is a charter member of the Manitoba Major Junior Hockey League (MMJHL).

Since 2010, Century Arena has been the home of the Twins, who have won seven league championships. Fort Garry/Fort Rouge has also won the Art Moug Trophy (regular season title) five times.

History

League championships

Jack Mackenzie Trophy (playoffs) 
 1974-75, 1975-76, 1976-77, 1977-78, 1982-83, 1998-99, 1999-00

Art Moug Trophy (regular season)
 1976-77, 1977-78, 1998-99, 1999-00, 2000-01

References

External links
Fort Garry/Fort Rouge Twins website

Ice hockey teams in Winnipeg
Twins
Twins